South LA Cafe is a black-owned coffee shop located on Browning Boulevard in Los Angeles, California.

History
South LA Cafe opened for business in December 2019 by husband and wife Joe Ward-Wallace and Celia Ward-Wallace.

Reception
The Los Angeles Standard Newspaper called South LA Cafe a "cultural hub that serves amazing coffee".

References

2019 establishments in California
Black-owned restaurants in the United States
Coffeehouses and cafés in the United States
Restaurants in Los Angeles